Fruit Ganesh is one of the best known Ganesh stores in the old city of Hyderabad. 

Every year during the Ganesh Chaturti festival, the fruits for the Ganesha statue are placed at Pardiwada, New Shakkar Gunj, Rajanna Bavi, Hyderabad. This Ganesh is also known as Panda Ganesh and will later be immersed at the Hussain Sagar.

Namaste Telangana (2014) newspaper stated "awesome Ganesh idol with flowers and fruits."

Sakshi (newspaper) (2015) newspaper stated "Fruits Ganesh & Chain Ganesh idols are getting ready for immersion in Hyderabad."

On the occasion of Ganesh immersion, one can see the various types of Ganesh statues, that have been placed in different locations of the city. These statues are decorated with various types of items. 

In the old city at the Rajanna Bavi colony, people pray to the Ganesh statue while it is decorated with various types of fruits. One can also come across the chain Ganesh statues at Tank Band which are getting ready for immersion.

The Ganesh immersion truck of the Pardhiwada's (fruit sellers) from the New Shakkar Gunj, Rajanna Bavi was the star attraction as it was completely decorated with over 2,000 fruits. There was also a 85-kilo laddu and a 25-kilo garland on the idol.

Preparation for Ganesh Immersion 
There were groups of individuals, which included women and youngsters, which were seen seated beside the ramping tall mountain of apples, grapes, flowers, guavas, coconuts, maize and a variety of other fruits carefully stringed into fruit garlands, all of which would be adorning the trucks carrying over 3,000 kg Ganesh statues, of various hues and sizes, during the procession.

References 

Forms of Ganesha
Hinduism in India
Religion in Hyderabad, India
Festivals in Hyderabad, India